Lilian Odaa Adera (born 7 May 1994) is a Kenyan footballer who plays as a defender. She has been a member of the Kenya women's national team.

International career
Adera capped for Kenya at senior level during the 2018 Africa Women Cup of Nations qualification.

International goals
Scores and results list Kenya's goal tally first

See also
List of Kenya women's international footballers

References

1994 births
Living people
People from Kisumu County
Kenyan women's footballers
Women's association football defenders
Kenya women's international footballers